Kloster Allerheiligen (All Saints abbey) is a former Benedictine monastery in the Swiss municipality of Schaffhausen in the Canton of Schaffhausen. The church Münster Allerheiligen is the oldest building in Schaffhausen, and houses also the Museum zu Allerheiligen.

Geography 
Today the convent houses the Museum zu Allerheiligen, an art museum and a natural history museum, the monastery garden, and the buildings of the former convent, including the library. The former monastery's building complex is located at the center of the historic old city of the municipality of Schaffhausen in the Canton of Schaffhausen, includes the oldest buildings that still exist in Schaffhausen.

History 

The development of the city of Schaffhausen is closely linked to the Nellenburg noble family who became extinct around 1100 AD. Various archaeological finds and the building of the present church of St. Johann (John) date back to around 1000 AD. The Earls (German: Grafen) von Nellenburg recognized the importance of the geographical area as a transshipment of goods on the Rhine river, and the order to bypass the Rheinfall waterfalls, controlled by the Wörth Castle. The monastery was founded by Eberhard von Nellenburg in 1049, on 22 November it was consecrated by Pope Leo IX, and in 1064 the construction works were completed. The church was dedicated to the Saviour, the Holy Cross, the Virgin Mary and All the Saints. In 1067 count Eberhard strengthened his rule in Schaffhausen, and received by Pope Alexander II comprehensive protection and sovereign rights for the monastery. Allerheiligen became, instead of the Reichenau Abbey, the new grave lay by the founding family, and various renovations and additions. Eberhard became after 1075 a Benedictine monk in the abbey, and died there in 1078 or 1079. He was buried in the outdoor crypt that was built for the family.

In the so-called Investiture Controversy conflict between the Roman Catholic church in Rome and the secular power, the pope loyal Count Burkhard von Nellenburg, the son and heir of Eberhard, conformed in 1080 all of the rights of the monastery. The monastery was directly subordinate to the Pope, and received the vast estate of the family, the free election of the abbot, and the mint money market as well as the town of Schaffhausen. Thus the abbot became the new lord of the city. Burkhard remained the monastery's Vogt, and motivated the Abbot William to join with some monks from the Hirsau Abbey, to reform the monastery on the model of Hirsau.

After more than four centuries of economic and political decline, Michael Eggendorfer, the last abbot of the monastery, initiated the last renovations in 1521/22. During the Reformation in Switzerland, the abbey was abolished, and the Cathedral became the second main city church in 1524.

Convent buildings 
The first extensions of the abbey included the east wing of the convent building with the chapter house of the monks on the ground floor, and a dormitory with latrines upstairs. In the west, the monastery gate, a two-storey house for guests and lay brothers were added, built around the three-aisled Basilica with a three-apsed choir, a transept and a double tower facade to the west. The westerly courtyard was also built in the foundation era, preceded by a single goal, which was flanked by two chapels. About this door system, there was possibly the entrance to the Nellenburg Palatinate, once the residence of the family. The monastery was modeled on the church buildings of the Cluny Abbey. The monastery consists of a cloister, the garden, the two-winged, two-storey convent buildings and the domestic buildings. In the mid-1460s Abbot Berchtold Wiechser initiated the construction of the Bindhaus (cooperage) over the large wine cellar. In 1521/22 a new convent house with monk cells instead of the old hospital, as well as a Beguine house were built. In 1529 the convent buildings were redeveloped as houses. Twelve years later, the city council moved the municipal cemetery in the former eastern cloister garden. In the winter of 1543, a boys' school was established. The cloister garden was used from 1577 to 1874 as the cemetery for the privileged citizens of Schaffhausen.

Münster Schaffhausen 

Eberhard von Nellenburg also financed the monastery's church third central tower to the west, extended with a new chancel choir grown in the apex outdoor crypt, as a burial chamber, and a subsequent courtyard. Around 1090, the church was partially demolished to make place for a larger Cathedral. Late Romanesque expansions were added between 1150 and 1250. Abbot Ullrich initiated the construction of the cathedral tower, the present herb garden, the building of the hospital and the novitiate, as well as a loggia. The St. Johann's chapel was vaulted, and upstairs was a further chapel. The ornately decorated semi-circular arched lunettes of the former upper chapel, are among the finest examples of Romanesque architectural sculpture in the monastery, and are on display in the museum. In 1521/22 the old St. Mary's chapel was rebuilt into the Annakapelle. In addition, the small cemetery chapel in the now Oswaldkapelle, and the abbey's chapel of St. Michael and Erhard were built.

Bibliothek am Münsterplatz 
In the Middle Ages, the library was located in the Benedictine monastery, in the Franciscan mendicant and in St. Johann's church. After the Reformation the books were placed in the sacristy of St. Johann. The collection increased by gifts and purchases since 1540, and it was called Bibliotheca publica or Liberey, but still mainly used by the clergy. In 1636 citizens founded the municipal library, geared towards the sciences and arts, the present Stadtbibliothe (city library). In the 18th century two private reading societies re-established the  Ministerialbibliothek, being the book collection in the St. Johann church. Since 1923 the city library has been located on the Münsterplatz Square, situated in a building that was built in 1554 as an urban granary. Between 1993 and 1995, the library was remodeled and expanded by an underground magazine, serving also as the cantonal library.

Museum zu Allerheiligen 
The Museum zu Allerheiligen (English: All Saints Museum) building complex was rebuilt between 1921 and 1938 into a museum, to house the great artistic and cultural historical collections, clubs, and private had gathered over decades, to be a place of storage and presentation. The museum exhibited during the first decades in the fields of archeology, history and art, focusing primarily on craft-oriented and categories as chronologically structured tours. An important extension was the integration of natural history collections and the construction of a natural history permanent exhibition. Since then, the museum also hosts regular natural history exhibitions.

Its extensive permanent collections and temporary exhibitions, the museum provides a wide variety of topics: Interdisciplinary special exhibitions stimulate discussion with current cultural and scientific themes, as well by the universality of the medieval monastery, the imposing cathedral, the idyllic herb garden and the largest freely accessible cloister of Switzerland. It is operated by financial contribution of the canton of Schaffhausen, foundations, associations and sponsorships.

Facilities 
Public transportation is provided by the S-Bahn Zürich line S16 (ZVV), S22 (ZVV) and S33 (ZVV), or in general by SBB railway or Deutsche Bahn DB to Schaffhausen main station. Local bus lines provides the stops Rhybadi/IWC by line 5 and Schifflände by line 8.

The museum is closed on Mondays, usually the museum is open from 11:00 (11 am) to 17:00 (5 pm); after hours visits are available by appointment, as well as guided tours for groups. The monastery's buildings houses the museum, as well as the museum's shop, a restaurant and rooms for seminars. The staff of the museum consists of approximately 25 employees.

Cultural heritage of national importance 
The abbey and the library are listed in the Swiss inventory of cultural property of national and regional significance as Class A objects of national importance.

Literature 
 Kurt Bänteli, Hans Peter Mathis: Das ehemalige Kloster zu Allerheiligen in Schaffhausen. Schweizerische Kunstführer GSK Nr. 76, Gesellschaft für Schweizerische Kunstgeschichte, Bern 2004, ISBN 
 Kurt Bänteli: Das Kloster Allerheiligen in Schaffhausen. Zum 950. Jahr seiner Gründung am 22. November 1049. Schaffhauser Archäologie, Vol. 4, Schaffhausen 1999, .
 Thomas Hildbrand: Herrschaft, Schrift und Gedächtnis. Das Kloster Allerheiligen und sein Umgang mit Wissen in Wirtschaft, Recht und Archiv (11.-16. Jahrhundert). Zürich 1996, .

References

External links 

  , of Museum zu Allerheiligen
 

Buildings and structures completed in the 11th century
1049 establishments in Europe
11th-century establishments in Switzerland
1938 establishments in Switzerland
Museums established in 1938
Schaffhausen
History museums in Switzerland
Buildings and structures in the canton of Schaffhausen
Tourist attractions in the canton of Schaffhausen
Cultural property of national significance in the canton of Schaffhausen
Former countries in Europe
1529 disestablishments in Europe
16th-century disestablishments in the Old Swiss Confederacy
Libraries in Switzerland